The Yamaha AT1 is a single cylinder enduro/adventure bike produced by Yamaha motor company from 1969 to 1971.

The Yamaha AT1 was available in three different models, each corresponding to the year of production.  1969 Yamaha AT1, 1970 Yamaha AT1B, 1971 Yamaha AT1C.  Each year the AT1 was also available in the Motocross edition designated by an M.  The M models were very similar to the regular models other than a few performance enhancing features, such as weight reduction, higher compression ratio, tuned exhaust, larger carburettor with 26 mm throttle bore, tuned gearing ratio, etc.

Engine and transmission

Models and VIN

AT1